Medeya "Mzia" Jugeli (August 1, 1925 – January 8, 2016) was a Georgian artistic gymnast. She competed at the 1952 Summer Olympics, finishing within top 15 in all artistic gymnastics events, and winning one gold and one silver medal. She won seven national titles in the vault, in 1946, 1947 and 1951–1955. After retirement she worked as gymnastics coach.  She died in Tbilisi in 2016, aged 90.

References

1925 births
2016 deaths
Gymnasts at the 1952 Summer Olympics
Olympic gymnasts of the Soviet Union
Olympic gold medalists for the Soviet Union
Olympic silver medalists for the Soviet Union
Olympic medalists in gymnastics
Soviet female artistic gymnasts
Female artistic gymnasts from Georgia (country)
Honoured Masters of Sport of the USSR
Sportspeople from Kutaisi
Medalists at the 1952 Summer Olympics